Jumping the Creek is an album by jazz saxophonist Charles Lloyd, recorded in  January 2004 by Lloyd with Geri Allen, Robert Hurst and Eric Harland.

Reception 
The Allmusic review by Thom Jurek awarded the album 4 stars and states "this, like Lloyd's other recordings on ECM is about emotion, feeling, and a sense of peace and serenity. Lloyd uses the rough places in his improvisations, to be sure, but it is only to make the rough places plain, limpid, utterly integrated in a serene whole. On Jumping the Creek he succeeds seamlessly and ups his own artistic ante". The All About Jazz review by John Kelman stated "Jumping the Creek represents a clear highlight in a career filled with memorable milestones".

Track listing
All compositions by Charles Lloyd except as indicated

 "Ne Me Quitte Pas (If You Go Away)" (Jacques Brel) - 13:29  
 "Ken Katta Ma Om (Bright Sun Upon You)" - 5:45  
 "Angel Oak Revisited" - 3:34  
 "Canon Perdido" - 3:01  
 "Jumping the Creek" - 5:57  
 "The Sufi's Tears" - 3:06  
 "Georgia Bright Suite: Pythagoras at Jeckyll Island/Sweet Georgia Bright" - 13:34  
 "Come Sunday" (Duke Ellington) - 5:52  
 "Both Veils Must Go" - 3:00  
 "Song of the Inuit" - 11:26

Personnel
Charles Lloyd - tenor saxophone, soprano saxophone, tarogato
Geri Allen - piano
Robert Hurst - double bass
Eric Harland - drums

References

2005 albums
Charles Lloyd (jazz musician) albums
Albums produced by Manfred Eicher
ECM Records albums